WEC 29: Condit vs. Larson was a mixed martial arts event held by World Extreme Cagefighting. The event took place on Sunday, August 5, 2007 at the Hard Rock Hotel and Casino in Las Vegas, Nevada. The event aired live on the Versus Network.

The main event featured the WEC Welterweight title fight between champion, Carlos Condit, and challenger, Brock Larson.   The show also featured the U.S. debut of PRIDE veteran Paulo Filho as he fought Joe Doerksen for the vacant WEC Middleweight title.

Results

Reported Payouts
The following is the reported payout to the fighters as reported to the Nevada State Athletic Commission. It does not include sponsor money or "locker room" bonuses often given by the WEC.

Carlos Condit: $26,000 (includes $13,000 win bonus) def. Brock Larson: $12,000
Paulo Filho: $50,000 ($15,000 win bonus) def. Joe Doerksen: $30,000
Jeff Curran: $10,000 ($2,000 win bonus) def. Stephen Ledbetter: $5,000
Jamie Varner: $14,000 ($7,000 win bonus) def. Sherron Leggett: $4,000
Hiromitsu Miura: $6,000 ($3,000 win bonus) def. Fernando Gonzalez: $3,000
Antonio Banuelos: $8,000 ($4,000 win bonus) def. Justin Robbins: $2,000
Eric Schambari: $8,000 ($4,000 win bonus) def. Logan Clark: $6,000
Steve Cantwell: $6,000 ($3,000 win bonus) def. Justin McElfresh: $3,000
Blas Avena: $4,500 ($2,000 win bonus) def. Tiki Ghosn: $5,000

See also 
 World Extreme Cagefighting
 List of WEC champions
 List of WEC events
 2007 in WEC

External links
Official WEC website

References
 WEC 29 Fight Card

World Extreme Cagefighting events
2007 in mixed martial arts
Mixed martial arts in Las Vegas
2007 in sports in Nevada
Hard Rock Hotel and Casino (Las Vegas)